Horneman is a surname. Notable people with the surname include:

C. F. E. Horneman (1840–1906), Danish composer, conductor, music publisher, and music instructor
Christian Horneman (1765–1844), Danish painter
Christian Hersleb Horneman (1781–1860), Norwegian jurist and elected official
Emil Horneman (1809–1870), Danish composer